Beldale Ball (1976−2004) was a brown Thoroughbred racehorse stallion by Nashua out of the mare San Cat (by Barbizon).

Trained by Colin Hayes and owned by the Swettenham Stud Syndicate (Robert Sangster) his best win came in the 1980 VRC Melbourne Cup.

Having an undistinguished racetrack career in England as a three-year-old he was sent to Australia and Colin Hayes to train.

Ridden by John Letts and carrying the featherweight of just 49.5 kg he took the lead at the half way mark of the race and was never headed.

His victory was the first Melbourne Cup win for trainer Colin Hayes.

Namesake
Australian rail operator CFCL Australia named locomotive CF4405 after the horse.

Pedigree

References

1976 racehorse births
2004 racehorse deaths
Racehorses bred in Florida
Racehorses trained in the United Kingdom
Racehorses trained in Australia
Melbourne Cup winners
Thoroughbred family A1